The Council for the Defense of Historical, Archaeological, Artistic and Tourist Heritage, or CONDEPHAAT, protects, values and communicates information about cultural heritage in the State of São Paulo, Brazil. This includes monuments, buildings, natural areas, and historical areas, amongst other things. The council was started in 1968. It is linked with SEC-SP.

References 

Heritage organizations
São Paulo (state)
History organisations based in Brazil
Organizations established in 1968
1968 establishments in Brazil